3MW may refer to:

 3-Minute Warning, a professional wrestling tag team
 Three-minute warning (football), a rule in Canadian football
 3 Minute Wonder, a Channel 4 documentary slot
 Three Minute Warning, a song by Liquid Tension Experiment

See also
 MW3 (disambiguation)